Events from the year 1635 in England.

Incumbents
 Monarch – Charles I
 Secretary of State – Sir John Coke
 Lord Chancellor – Thomas Coventry, 1st Baron Coventry

Events
 April – Construction is completed on the Jacobean mansion Aston Hall
 4 August – second writ for ship money is issued, extending the payments to inland towns.
 Peter Paul Rubens paints the ceiling of the Banqueting House, Whitehall.
 First secondary school established in the North American colonies, the English High and Latin School at Boston.
 First General Post Office opens to the public, at Bishopsgate, London.
 English settlers begin the colonisation of Connecticut.

Literature
 The stage tragedy Hannibal and Scipio by Thomas Nabbes is first performed by Queen Henrietta's Men

Births
 18 July – Robert Hooke, scientist (died 1703)
 22 November – Francis Willughby, biologist (died 1672)
 28 December – Princess Elizabeth of England (died 1650)
 31 December – Sir Robert Southwell, diplomat and politician (died 1702)
 Approximate date – Catherine Pegge, royal mistress

Deaths
 12 January – Anne Cornwallis, benefactor (born 1590)
 March – Thomas Randolph, poet (born 1605)
 27 March – Robert Naunton, politician (born 1563)
 25 November – John Hall, physician and son-in-law of William Shakespeare (born 1575)

References

 
Years of the 17th century in England